A Tale of Two Villages (Spanish: Historia de dos aldeas) is a 1951 Spanish drama film directed by Antonio del Amo and starring Nani Fernández, Carlos Muñoz and Manolo Morán.

Cast
 Manuel Arbó 
 Xan das Bolas 
 José Bódalo 
 Nani Fernández 
 Juana Mansó 
 Arturo Marín 
 Manolo Morán 
 Carlos Muñoz 
 Manuel Requena 
 Lina Rosales 
 Porfiria Sanchíz

References

Bibliography 
 de España, Rafael. Directory of Spanish and Portuguese film-makers and films. Greenwood Press, 1994.

External links 
 

1951 drama films
Spanish drama films
1951 films
1950s Spanish-language films
Films directed by Antonio del Amo
Spanish black-and-white films
1950s Spanish films